Klickitat Elementary and High School is a public school located in Klickitat, Washington that serves 111 students in grades kindergarten through 12. Unlike most school districts, where there is a clear distinction between the elementary, middle school/junior high and high school levels, they are combined at Klickitat Elementary and High School. 88% of the students are White, while 5% are American Indian, 4% are Hispanic, 3% are Black and 1% are two or more races.

References

External links
Klickitat School District #402

Public high schools in Washington (state)
High schools in Klickitat County, Washington